Elias's Atlantic spiny-rat or the Rio de Janeiro spiny rat (Trinomys eliasi), is a spiny rat species from South America. It is found in Brazil.

References

Woods, C. A. and C. W. Kilpatrick. 2005.  Hystricognathi.  Pp 1538–1600 in Mammal Species of the World a Taxonomic and Geographic Reference 3rd ed. D. E. Wilson and D. M. Reeder eds. Smithsonian Institution Press, Washington D.C.

Trinomys
Mammals described in 1993